Alexander Erler (born 27 October 1997) is an Austrian professional tennis player. He has a career high ATP singles ranking of world No. 322, achieved on 4 October 2021. He has a career high doubles ranking of world No. 42, achieved on 6 March 2023. He has won three doubles titles on the ATP Tour with compatriot Lucas Miedler, at home tournaments in Kitzbühel and in Vienna, and in Acapulco.

On the ITF Futures Tour, Erler has reached 15 ITF singles finals, with a record of 7 wins and 8 losses. He has also reached 38 ITF doubles finals, with a record of 25 wins and 13 losses.

Professional career

2015: ATP doubles debut
Erler made his ATP main draw debut at the 2015 Generali Open Kitzbühel in the doubles draw, partnering Philipp Kohlschreiber.

2021: ATP singles debut and first match win, maiden doubles ATP title
At the 2021 Generali Open Kitzbühel, Erler won his first ATP match as a wildcard defeating Carlos Alcaraz. At the same tournament, he won the doubles title partnering Lucas Miedler.

2022: Second ATP doubles title, top 50 debut
The Austrian team of Erler/Miedler clinched their second and biggest title on home soil at the ATP 500 2022 Erste Bank Open without dropping a set. As a result he made his top 50 debut in the doubles rankings on 31 October 2021.

2023: Grand Slam debut, Second ATP 500 title
At the Mexican Open he won the title with compatriot and partner Lucas Miedler defeating en route top seeds Wesley Koolhof and Neal Skupski.

Doubles performance timeline
Current through the 2023 Abierto Mexicano Telcel.

ATP career finals

Doubles: 3 (3 titles)

ATP Challenger and ITF Futures finals

Singles: 15 (7–8)

Doubles: 38 (25–13)

References

External links

1997 births
Living people
Austrian male tennis players
Sportspeople from Innsbruck